Macon Township is a township in Franklin County, Nebraska, in the United States.

History
Macon was named by an early settler for his former hometown of Macon, Georgia.

References

Townships in Franklin County, Nebraska